The 2012 New Mexico Stars season was the team's first season as a professional indoor football franchise and first in the Indoor Football League (IFL). One of sixteen teams competing in the IFL for the 2012 season, the Rio Rancho, New Mexico-based New Mexico Stars were members of the Intense Conference.

Under the leadership of owner/general manager Dart Clark and head coach Chris Williams, the team played their home games at the Santa Ana Star Center in Rio Rancho, New Mexico.

Schedule
Key:

Regular season
All start times are local time

Roster

Standings

References

New Mexico Stars
New Mexico Stars
New Mexico Stars